Sandvigodden Lighthouse is a coastal lighthouse in the municipality of Arendal in Agder county, Norway. The light is located on the southeast shore of the island of Hisøya on the edge of the village of Sandviga.  The light marks the west side of the entrance to the Galtesundet strait, which leads north to the town of Arendal.

The lighthouse was originally built in 1844. In 1934, a new lighthouse was constructed right in front of the older tower. The light emits a white, red, or green light (depending on direction), occulting three times every 10 seconds.

History
The original lighthouse was built in 1844 out of masonry. The tower was attached to a two and a half story lighthouse keeper's house. Local ship owners gave money to construct this lighthouse. It was closed in 1934 when a new automated lighthouse was built immediately next to the old tower. The old keepers house and tower were sold and are now a private residence.

Media gallery

See also
Lighthouses in Norway
List of lighthouses in Norway

References

Buildings and structures in Arendal
Lighthouses in Agder